Whole New Thing is a 2005 Canadian drama film directed by Amnon Buchbinder. The film is a coming-of-age narrative about a 13-year-old boy, Emerson Thorsen (played by Aaron Webber) who lives in an isolated straw-bale house with his counter-cultural parents, Rog (Robert Joy) and Kaya (Rebecca Jenkins). However, when Kaya decides that homeschooling provides too little structure for Emerson, she enrolls him at the local middle-school under the tuition of 43-year-old Don Grant (Daniel MacIvor). Emerson, despite displaying a developed intellectual approach to sexuality, discovers the problems that come with developing a crush, and the taboo of this crush being his teacher.

Production
The script was co-written by Buchbinder and Daniel MacIvor, and was filmed entirely on location in Mahone Bay and Halifax, Nova Scotia, during winter and over the course of 15 days.

The film soundtrack is scored by David Buchbinder, and contains songs by The Hidden Cameras.

The film is distributed by THINKFilm and co-funded by the NSFDC.

Awards
Robert Joy received a Genie Award nomination for Best Supporting Actor at the 27th Genie Awards.

References

External links
 
 

2005 LGBT-related films
2005 films
Canadian LGBT-related films
English-language Canadian films
Films shot in Halifax, Nova Scotia
LGBT-related comedy-drama films
2000s coming-of-age comedy-drama films
Canadian coming-of-age comedy-drama films
2000s English-language films
2000s Canadian films